Evidence (announced as Puthumazhatthullikal) is a 1988 Indian Malayalam-language film directed by actor Raghavan, starring Shankar. The film is the remake of Tamil fim Udhaya Geetham.

Cast

Shankar - Prince
Seema -  Alphonsa John Jacob
Vani Viswanath - Dalia
Radha Ravi - Rajashekhar
Captain Raju - Damu
Adoor Bhasi - Advocate Chidambaram
Raghavan - Father Dominic
Prathapachandran - John Jacob
Sudheer - Thomas
Janardanan - D I G
P. Sreekumar - Sharath
Vincent - Asst. Jail Superintendent
Bobby Kottarakkara - a convict
Radha Ravi-Rajashekhar
M Chandran Nair
K.G. Menon 
Sugandhi

References

1988 films
1980s Malayalam-language films